weGrow, was a national hydroponics franchise that sold products and services to help patients cultivate medicinal marijuana. It was the first hydroponics store in the US that openly talked about cultivating cannabis for medical use. It was branded as the "first honest hydro store" and called the "Wal-Mart of Weed" by CNN.

History  

weGrow was founded in January 2010 by Dhar Mann and Derek Peterson. They began franchising the brand in October of that year. weGrow currently has franchises in Sacramento, California and Phoenix, Arizona, with a non-retail distribution hub in Oakland, California.

weGrow stores did not sell marijuana, but sold the supplies and services that cultivators need to grow marijuana. They also provided education and advice on all aspects of medical marijuana cultivation. Stores gave indoor grow demonstrations using real (non-marijuana) plants and offer classes on how medical marijuana can be safely and responsibly cultivated. On-site medical doctors performed patient evaluations, and expert technicians advise customers on building professional grow rooms.

A fourth weGrow store opened in Washington D.C. on March 30, 2012, the same day that the six approved medical marijuana cultivators were announced in D.C. The weGrow D.C. store is owned and operated by Franchisee Alex Wong. The store is 2,500 square feet and is located at 1522 Rhode Island Avenue NE. The weGrow D.C. location grand opening was attended and covered by numerous media outlets, including Huffington Post, USA Today, the Washington Post  and many others.

The stored closed in February 2011, due to running at a loss according to a minority owner.

Past closed locations 
weGrow had four retail spaces. 
 Oakland, California – This store opened January 28, 2010, initially under the brand “iGrow.” It reopened as weGrow on October 3, 2010. The  store was originally a hydroponics superstore, but the franchising of the weGrow brand turned this store into a non-retail distribution hub.
 Sacramento, California – The first weGrow franchise opened this  store on February 26, 2011.
 Phoenix, Arizona – A franchisee opened this store on June 1, 2011.
 Washington D.C. – A franchisee opened this store on March 30, 2012.

References 

Cannabis companies of the United States
Medicinal use of cannabis
Hydroponics
American companies established in 2010
Retail companies established in 2010
2010 in cannabis